Stephan Berg (born 11 February 1957) is a Swedish composer and songwriter. He was the writer of the Carola song Fångad av en stormvind, which won the Eurovision Song Contest in 1991.

See also
Carola Häggkvist
Fångad av en stormvind
Eurovision Song Contest 1991

References

External links
 Official website

1957 births
Swedish composers
Swedish male composers
Eurovision Song Contest winners
Living people